A spit hood, spit mask, mesh hood or spit guard is a restraint device intended to prevent a person from spitting or biting. The use of the hoods has been controversial.

Justification for use
Proponents, often including police unions and associations, say the spit hoods can help protect personnel from exposure to serious infections like hepatitis and that in London, 59% of injecting drug users test positive for hepatitis C. According to Occupational Safety and Health Administration regulations in the United States, saliva is considered potentially infectious for hepatitis C, HIV and other bloodborne pathogens only if visible blood is present.

Opposition to use
Several studies have concluded that the risk of transmission of disease from spitting was low. 

The spit hoods have been criticised for breaching human rights guidelines. Critics describe the hoods as primitive, cruel, and degrading.

There is a risk of death. According to The New York Times, spit hoods have been involved in several deaths in law enforcement custody.

Use around the world

United Kingdom
Some British police chiefs have privately expressed concerns that the hoods are reminiscent of those used at the Guantanamo Bay detention camp. A decision by the Metropolitan Police Service in London to start using spit hoods was condemned by the human rights group Amnesty International, the civil rights group Liberty and the campaign group Inquest. Many major British police forces have chosen not to use spit hoods.

Australia
The use of spit hoods and restraint chairs at the Don Dale Youth Detention Centre in the Northern Territory, Australia, led to the establishment of the Royal Commission into the Protection and Detention of Children in the Northern Territory. Five years after the death of an Aboriginal man in custody in South Australia in September 2016, the use of spit hoods was banned in the state.

See also
Muzzle (device)
Restraint chair

References 

Law enforcement equipment
Physical restraint
Masks in law